H.G Alexios Mar Eusebius is Metropolitan of Calcutta Diocese of Malankara Orthodox Syrian Church.

References

1964 births
Living people
Malankara Orthodox Syrian Church bishops